The Chief of the Astronaut Office is the most senior leadership position for active astronauts at the National Aeronautics and Space Administration (NASA). The Chief Astronaut serves as head of the NASA Astronaut Corps and is the principal advisor to the NASA Administrator on astronaut training and operations.

History
When Deke Slayton was grounded from the Mercury Seven due to a heart condition, he took on the position of Coordinator of Astronaut Activities and informally held the title of "chief astronaut". In this role, he held responsibility for the operation of the astronaut office.

The position of Chief of the Astronaut Office was officially created in July 1964, when Alan Shepard was named as the first Chief Astronaut. His responsibilities included monitoring the coordination, scheduling, and control of all activities involving NASA astronauts. This included monitoring the development and implementation of effective training programs to assure the flight readiness of available pilot and non-pilot personnel for assignment to crew positions on crewed space flights; furnishing pilot evaluations applicable to the design, construction, and operations of spacecraft systems and related equipment; and providing qualitative scientific and engineering observations to facilitate overall mission planning, formulation of feasible operational procedures, and selection and conduct of specific experiments for each flight.

The Chief of the Astronaut Office often returns to active duty once their term is complete. The Chief is currently responsible for managing Astronaut Office resources and operations, and helps develop astronaut flight crew operation concepts and crew assignments for future spaceflight missions.

List of Chief Astronauts

In popular culture
In For All Mankind, an American alternate history streaming series, Slayton holds the office until he selects himself for duty onboard Apollo 24, aboard which he dies when the mission ends in disaster. He is succeeded by main character Ed Baldwin, who is himself succeeded by Molly Cobb after Baldwin assigns himself to command the first flight of NASA's new nuclear-powered space shuttle.

Notes

Deke Slayton
Alan Shepard
Thomas P. Stafford
John Young (astronaut)